Prăjești may refer to several villages in Romania:

 Prăjești, a commune in Bacău County
 Prăjești, a village in Măgirești Commune, Bacău County
 Prăjești, a village in Secuieni Commune, Neamț County